This is a list of now defunct airlines from Uganda.

See also
 List of airlines of Uganda
 List of airports in Uganda

References

Uganda
Airlines
Airlines, defunct